Mitrastemon is a genus of two widely disjunct species of parasitic plants. It is the only genus within the family Mitrastemonaceae. Mitrastemon species are root endoparasites, which grow on Fagaceae. It is also a non-photosynthetic plant that parasitizes other plants such as Castanopsis sieboldii. The parasitic plant was first discovered by botanist Eizi Matuda during an expedition to Mt. Ovand in the state of Chiapas, Mexico (Matuda, 1947). The different species were originally named by a friend of Matuda, Yamamoto in 1925–1926. Mitrastemon yamamotoi is a protandrous plant. Its flowers go through a male phase before transforming into their final female form. The flowers of M. yamamotoi attract a variety of insects ranging from wasps to flies and beetles. Among these, beetles are the best pollinators for this plant since their visit to the flower would pick up a large amount of pollen and they would pollinate from each of the flowers that they had already visited. The plant is endemic to tropical and subtropical forest regions such as Southeast Asia and Japan.

Taxonomy
Originally Mitrastemon was placed within the order Rafflesiales, together with other parasitic plants, but this order was long suspected to be actually polyphyletic. In 2004, the genus was found to be related to Ericales by comparing their mitochondrial DNA.

Several orthographic variants of the name Mitrastemon exist, including Mitrastema and Mitrastemma. The correct taxonomic name is Mitrastemon, the use of which was proposed and justified in an article by Reveal and approved by the Nomenclature Committee for Vascular Plants of the International Association for Plant Taxonomy in a subsequent article.

The species has a cylindrical body ranging from 3 cm to 7 cm in height with a tuberous base. During an early developmental stage it appears an off-white color; however, once it is dried it becomes a dark brown color (Mir et al., 2016).

Life cycle
The plant is observed only during the winter season and it completes its visible life cycle from November to April (Mir et al., 2016).
Mitrastemon is completely embedded within the tissues of its host, except during the reproduction stage when above-ground parts emerge from host tissues.

Ecology
Unlike other plants, the flowers of this organism change sex from male to female. Various insects are involved in pollination. Mitrastemon yamamotol is mainly pollinated by social wasps, but previously unnoticed pollination are also important, based on visitation frequency and pollen loads. There have been studies of the pollination that suggest that nocturnal visitors, such as crickets and cockroaches, contribute to geitonogamous pollination. Diurnal visitors like social wasps facilitate outcrossing.

Distribution
Mitrastemon yamamotoi is distributed in tropical and subtropical forests of Southeast Asia and Japan. Mitrastemon matudae is distributed from Southern Mexico to Colombia.

Species
There are two known species. M. matudae is found in Central America, while M. yamamotoi is found in Southeast Asia and Japan.

References

Further reading 
India Biodiversity Portal. (2019). Mitrastemon yamamotoi Makino. [online] Available at: https://indiabiodiversity.org/species/show/279958 [Accessed 1 Dec. 2019].
Parasiticplants.siu.edu. (2019). Parasitic Plant Connection – Mitrastemonaceae. [online] Available at: https://parasiticplants.siu.edu/Mitrastemonaceae/ [Accessed 1 Dec. 2019].

 Matuda, Eizi. "On the genus Mitrastemon." Bulletin of the Torrey Botanical Club (1947): 133-141.
 Rao, A. S., & Balakrishnan, N. P. (1972). Mitrastemon yalanotoi (Makino) Makino (Rafelesiaceaf)-a Unique Root Parasite New to the Indian Flora. Indian Forester, 98(4), 234-235.
 
 Leung, Tommy (9 March 2019). "Mitrastemon Yamamotoi". Parasite of the Day blog. Retrieved 7 December 2019.
 Matuda, Eizi. "On the genus Mitrastemon." Bulletin of the Torrey Botanical Club (1947): 133-141.

Ericales
Ericales genera
Parasitic plants
Endoparasites